Albert Stephens is an American former Negro league pitcher who played in the 1940s.

Stephens played for the New York Black Yankees in 1948. In six recorded games on the mound, he posted a 6.53 ERA over 20.2 innings.

References

External links
 and Seamheads

Year of birth missing
Place of birth missing
New York Black Yankees players
Baseball pitchers